"Walk Me Home" is a 2019 song by Pink.

Walk Me Home may also refer to:
 "Walk Me Home" (Mandy Moore song) (1999)
 "Mandy Moore: Walk Me Home", an episode of MTV's Making the Video
 "Walk Me Home", a 1983 song by Chet Atkins from Work It Out with Chet Atkins C.G.P.
 "Walk Me Home", a 2009 song by Memory Tapes (Dayve Hawke) from Seek Magic
 Walk Me Home, a 2014 album by Secret Cities
 Walk Me Home, a 2013 novel by Catherine Ryan Hyde
 Walk Me Home, a 1993 film by Timothy Neat shot on the island of Inch Kenneth

See also